Microdes is a genus of moths in the family Geometridae.

Species
Microdes arcuata
Microdes asystata
Microdes decora
Microdes diplodonta
Microdes epicryptis
Microdes haemobaphes
Microdes leptobrya
Microdes melanocausta
Microdes oriochares
Microdes quadristrigata
Microdes squamulata
Microdes typhopa
Microdes villosata

References

External links
Natural History Museum Lepidoptera genus database

Eupitheciini